SASL (from St Andrews Static Language, alternatively  St Andrews Standard Language) is a purely functional programming language developed by David Turner at the University of St Andrews in 1972, based on the applicative subset of ISWIM.  In 1976 Turner redesigned and reimplemented it as a non-strict (lazy) language.  In this form it was the foundation of Turner's later languages KRC and Miranda, but SASL appears to be untyped whereas Miranda has polymorphic types.

Burroughs Corporation used SASL to write a compiler and operating system.

Notes

References

External links 
 The SASL Language Manual

Academic programming languages
Functional languages
History of computing in the United Kingdom
Programming languages created in 1972